Aestus is a hypergolic liquid rocket engine used on an upper stage of Ariane 5 family rockets for the orbital insertion. It features unique design of 132 coaxial injection elements causing swirl mixing of the MMH propellants with nitrogen tetroxide oxidizer. The pressure-fed engine allows for multiple re-ignitions.

Operations 
Fuel and oxidizer are stored in two aluminium alloy tanks, fuel tank is spherical while oxidizer tank is enlarged due to different volumes required from engine operations. Before engine is started it is purged with helium and fuel is pressurized. Then oxidizer valve is opened in a center of injector followed by fuel injectors arranged on a chamber wall. Hypergolic propellants spontaneously ignite on contact expanding to supersonic velocities and escaping through cooled nozzle extension.

History 
Aestus was developed by the Ottobrunn Space Propulsion Centre between 1988 and 1995 with first flight as an upper stage of Ariane 5 G flight 502 and performed as designed. The first improvements were developed between 1999 and 2002 improving the frame performance and adjusting propellant mixture ratio from 2.05 to 1.90 with a first flight on an Ariane 5 flight 518 on 26 February 2004. Ignition qualification programme preparing engine for handling new Automated Transfer Vehicle that requires 3 ignitions per flight was completed in 2007 and flew with Jules Verne ATV on Ariane 5 flight 528.

Aestus II / RS-72 
Aestus II (also known as RS-72) was a turbopump-fed version of the pressure-fed Aestus developed in a collaboration between the Ottobrunn Space Propulsion Centre and Pratt & Whitney Rocketdyne (Boeing Rocketdyne at the time). It was designed for improved performance, thrust and reliability over its predecessor.

Aestus II development was supported by Pratt & Whitney Rocketdyne which provided turbopump for the engine. The first prototype variant, called RS-72 Pathfinder, successfully completed 14 tests at the White Sands Test Facility, reaching a 60 second burn time at 100% power in May 2000.

References

Rocket engines using hypergolic propellant
Spacecraft propulsion
Rocket engines using the pressure-fed cycle